18.11: A Code of Secrecy  is a 2014 Indian Hindi action film written and directed by Mohibul Haque and Produced by Merina Hauque.
Under the banner of Ultimate Pictures, the film stars Rehal Khan, Gulshan Grover and Mukesh Tiwari in the lead roles.
The movie has been listed as one of the worst Hindi movies ever by many critics.

Cast
 Rehal Khan as Rehal Khan
 Bridgette Irani as Suhana
 Gulshan Grover as Captain Rack
 Prem Chopra as Gogoi
 Mukesh Tiwari as Kuldeep Sharma
Nipon Goswami as Rehal's Father
Asrani as Habilder-Paholwan
Sameer Ali Khan as Martial Arts Instructor
Raja Borbhuyan as Chhotu Hawaldar
Joshizul Haque as D
Sujata Khound as Commando Vijay Lakshmi
Jishan Khan as Commando Shamim Khan
Suraj Kumar Kalita as Commando Pritam
Deepa Sethi as Tanyay
Md	as Mehatabul Haque

Production
This film produced by Merina Haque. Gulshan Grover visit Assam first time for this movie shooting. This film shot in Dhubri, Hajo, Guwahati and Shillong.

Soundtrack

The music of 18.11 A Code of secrecy is composed by Jaan Nissar Lone. Lyrics were by Tanveer Ghazi &
Sahil Fatehpuri.

Awards and nominations

References

External links
 
 

2014 films
Non-Assamese-language films with Assamese connection
Indian crime drama films
2010s Hindi-language films
2014 action thriller films
2014 crime thriller films
2014 crime drama films
Indian political thriller films
2014 directorial debut films
Hindi-language action films
Indian action thriller films